Podlanišče is a dispersed settlement in the hills southeast of Cerkno in the traditional Littoral region of Slovenia.

References

External links

Podlanišče on Geopedia

Populated places in the Municipality of Cerkno